Chase Onorati (born 20 August 1999) is a Zimbabwean swimmer. He competed in the men's 100 metre butterfly event at the 2018 FINA World Swimming Championships (25 m), in Hangzhou, China.

References

External links
 

1999 births
Living people
Zimbabwean male butterfly swimmers
Place of birth missing (living people)